Barry Corner is an unincorporated community located in the town of Pepin, Pepin County, Wisconsin, United States. Currently, the northeast and southwest quadrants have farm houses on them, while the northwest and southeast quadrants are crop fields.

The area is named after 1800s-era teacher Anna Barry, who taught in the one-room-schoolhouse that would become known as Barry Corner School. The site of the schoolhouse is located on County Road I, less than a mile from the CC/Bogus intersection.

References

Unincorporated communities in Pepin County, Wisconsin
Unincorporated communities in Wisconsin